Niedobczyce is a district of Rybnik, Silesian Voivodeship, southern Poland. Between 1955 and 1975 it was an independent town On December 31, 2013 it had about 12,300 inhabitants.

History 
The village was first mentioned in 1228 as Nedobcici.

After World War I in the Upper Silesia plebiscite 1,419 out of 1,816 voters in Niedobczyce voted in favour of joining Poland, against 395 opting for staying in Germany. In 1922 it became a part of Silesian Voivodeship, Second Polish Republic. They were then annexed by Nazi Germany at the beginning of World War II. After the war it was restored to Poland.

In years 1945-1954 it was a seat of a gmina. On November 13, 1954 it gained town rights. In 1955 Niewiadom was adjoined to the town. On May 27, 1975 it was amalgamated with Rybnik.

Sport 
 Rymer Niedobczyce, which in the late 1940s played for a year in the Ekstraklasa.

People 
 Damian Zimoń, Polish archbishop, born here in 1934;

References

Districts of Rybnik